Olde Town Arvada station is a commuter rail station on the G Line of the Denver RTD system in Denver, Colorado. It is located in downtown Arvada, Colorado and is the fifth stop from Denver Union Station. The station includes 600 parking spaces in a parking garage that is shared with local businesses. Construction on the station and garage began late 2014.

The public art chosen for the station is "Track Bone" by Frank Swanson and reflects how the railroad was in many ways the backbone of Arvada when it was founded in 1870. The station opened on April 26, 2019.

References 

Railway stations in the United States opened in 2019
RTD commuter rail stations
Arvada, Colorado
2019 establishments in Colorado